Greenlawn Cemetery is a historic cemetery at 57 Orne Street in Salem, Massachusetts.  The cemetery was founded in 1807, but received a major redesign in the 1880s to bring it into the then-popular rural cemetery style, with winding lanes and landscaping.  The  is notable for its large number of specimen plants, which is second in the state to the Arnold Arboretum in Boston.  It has more than 6000 burials, and is still in active use.

The cemetery was listed on the National Register of Historic Places in 2015.

It is the burial place of Medal of Honor recipient John Phillip Riley (1877–1950).  Reverend Jacob Stroyer (1848–1908) is buried there too.  Medal of Honor recipient Thomas E. Atkinson (1824–1868) has a cenotaph in his honor.

See also

 National Register of Historic Places listings in Salem, Massachusetts
 National Register of Historic Places listings in Essex County, Massachusetts

References

External links
 

Cemeteries on the National Register of Historic Places in Massachusetts
Cemeteries in Salem, Massachusetts
National Register of Historic Places in Salem, Massachusetts
Rural cemeteries
Cemeteries established in the 1850s
1854 establishments in Massachusetts